The United States Army Transportation Corps (USATC) S118 Class is a class of 2-8-2 steam locomotive.  Built to either ,  or  gauge, they were used in at least 24 different countries.

Based on Australia's new C17 class locomotives, their specifications were forwarded to the United States where the United States Army Transportation Corps (USATC) drew up plans for a 2-8-2 with specifications similar to a C17 class. 741 were built in the period late 1942–1945 with a further 52 appearing between 1945 and 1948.  They were built by Baldwin (253+33), Alco (338), Porter (25+5), Davenport (67+6) and Vulcan (58+8) in the United States. The first thirty were numbered 3000–3029, with subsequently locomotives numbered 130–249, and 257–889. Locomotives 640–660 and 789–810 were cancelled.

The S118 class were the most widespread of all the locomotives of the Second World War. The first twenty locomotives (3000–3019) were sent to Nigeria. Twenty (216–235) were delivered to Queensland where they formed the Queensland Railways AC16 Class. Others were sent to North Africa, Gold Coast, Iraq, India, and Burma.

After the war, surplus locomotives were sold to Malaya, the Philippines (as Manila Railroad 850 class), Siam, Cambodia, Cameroun, Tanganyika, and the United Fruit Company operations in Costa Rica and Honduras.

Copies
Baldwin built 33 copies for the Indian Railways, Porter built two for the Chemins de Fer des Grands Lacs in the Belgian Congo, Vulcan built a batch of eight for the Piraeus, Athens and Peloponnese Railways (SPAP) in Greece (class Δ). Davenport built six with a higher boiler pressure for the Chemin de Fer Franco-Ethiopien de Djibouti á Addis-Ababa.

Survivors
Several S118 locomotives still exist:

Gallery

References

External links 
 http://narrowmind.railfan.net/WPYR/late-steam/190dia.JPG
 http://www.steamlocomotive.com/australia/data.shtml
 http://www.qrig.org/motive-power/steam/ac16-class/
 http://www.railsnorth.com/wpyr-190s.pdf

 
S118
2-8-2 locomotives